James Andrew Eric Phelps (born 25 February 1986) is an English actor. He is known for playing Fred Weasley in the Harry Potter film series from 2001 to 2011, alongside his twin brother, Oliver Phelps. The twins have continued to work together as a duo on other projects.

Early life
James Phelps was born in the Sutton Coldfield area of Birmingham, England on 25 February 1986, 13 minutes after his brother Oliver Phelps. They are the only children of Susan (née Spare) and Martyn Phelps. Growing up, James and his brother attended Little Sutton Primary School and the Arthur Terry Secondary School. During the filming of the Harry Potter series, the twins were tutored on set.

Career
In 2000, despite having no previous acting experience, the twins skipped school to attend an open audition in Leeds. After about six auditions, the twins were cast as Fred and George Weasley in the film Harry Potter and the Philosopher's Stone. At the first table reading after being cast, James was given the role of Fred and Oliver was given the role of George.

Outside of acting, James Phelps worked as a runner on the set of Harry Potter and the Half-Blood Prince and on The Da Vinci Code.

In 2009, the twins appeared as brothers in the fifth episode of the third season of the TV series Kingdom. In 2012, they starred in A Mind's Eye, a short documentary film based on the philosophical ideas of Plato.

The twins have also been involved in the Harry Potter Exhibition. They were present during its 2009 opening in Chicago and later toured various cities and countries to promote it.

In January 2014, the twins attended the Harry Potter Celebration in Orlando, Florida along with Evanna Lynch, Matthew Lewis, and Devon Murray. They also made a LiveCast where they answered fans' questions and talked about the expansion at The Wizarding World of Harry Potter.

Phelps guest-starred in one episode of British television drama Silent Witness, which aired on the 6th of January 2015.

In 2019, he starred in fantasy movie Cadia: The World Within, and was also credited as associate producer on the project.

Podcast 
Phelps has collaborated with his brother on a podcast, which was launched on YouTube and various streaming services, including Spotify and iTunes. 

The first season, which premiered in 2017, featured James and Oliver discussing their previous travels. 

The second season of the podcast was released in 2020 during quarantine, and the twins interviewed guests and spoke about their personal lives. 

In 2021, they released a third season, titled "Normal Not Normal”, on which they collaborated with Stabl production; this season is more structured and professionally edited compared to the previous season. In this season, they discuss what normal really is and if it even exists. They have interviewed celebrities including Sasha Banks, Tom Hopper, and Mara Wilson, as well as their former costars, such as Katie Leung, Evanna Lynch, and Alfred Enoch.

Personal life and philanthropy
Phelps married Annika Ostle in 2016. The couple lives with their two dogs, Jason and Tonto.

Phelps supports Birmingham City football Club.

In January 2003, Phelps and his brother planted trees at the National Forest, in Leicestershire. The trees were birch and ash, the same types of wood that helped make the broomsticks used in the Harry Potter films.

The twins are supporters of Teenage Cancer Trust, the "Celebrity World Cup Soccer Six", the Virgin Money Giving drive, and Cancer Research UK in Australia.

Filmography

Film and television

Video games

References

External links

 

1986 births
Male actors from Birmingham, West Midlands
English male film actors
Identical twin male actors
Living people
People from Sutton Coldfield
English expatriates in the United States
English twins
English male child actors
21st-century English male actors
English film producers